Halti is a fell at the border between Norway and Finland. The Finnish side of Halti belongs to the municipality of Enontekiö in the province of Lapland.

The highest point in Finland is on a spur of Ráisduattarháldi at  known as Hálditšohkka at the border of Norway. The peak proper is not in Finland; the border marker is on a slope.

The reason for the border being the way it is can be traced to a Swedish-Danish border treaty in 1734, when Norway belonged to Denmark and Finland was part of Sweden. The treaty specifies the border only by some of its biggest natural features like mountains. Thus, international boundary commissions would walk the border and place border markers where it was convenient. The actual border was then agreed to lie on a straight line between these markers, as was the usual practice at the time.

A  trekking path leads from Saana, Kilpisjärvi to Halti. An easier route goes from a local road (open in summer only) going from Birtavarre in Norway, around  hiking to the highest point in Finland. The route is rocky and not really adapted to hiking.

Proposed border change
The idea gained substantial public support in both countries, and in July 2016 it was reported that the Prime Minister of Norway, Erna Solberg was seriously considering ceding the peak. Norway ultimately chose not to move the border, citing the Norwegian constitution's definition of the country as an "indivisible and inalienable" realm.

See also
 Scandinavian Mountains
 Extreme points of Finland
 List of highest points of European countries
 Ernst Thälmann Island, gifted symbolically by Cuba to East Germany in 1972.

References

External links

 "Hálditšohkka, Finland/Norway" on Peakbagger
 "Halti, Norway" on Peakbagger

Mountains of Finland
Mountains of Troms og Finnmark
Scandinavian Mountains
Enontekiö
International mountains of Europe
Finland–Norway border
Gáivuotna–Kåfjord
Landforms of Lapland (Finland)
One-thousanders of Finland
One-thousanders of Norway
Highest points of countries